Marie-Anne Collot (1748 – 24 February 1821) was a French sculptor. She was the student and daughter-in-law of Étienne Falconet and is most well known as a portraitist, close to the philosophic and artistic circles of Diderot and Catherine the Great.

Falconet's student
Marie-Anne Collot was born in Paris and started to work as a model at the age of 15 in the workshop of Jean-Baptiste II Lemoyne. He had a determining influence on her career as a portraitist. She then entered Etienne Falconet's workshop, who was a close friend of Diderot. She became Falconet's pupil and faithful friend. Her younger brother became an apprentice at the publisher's André le Breton, who was one of the four publishers of Diderot and D'Alembert's Encyclopédie.

Early sculptures
Her first works consisted of terracotta busts of Falconet's friends including Diderot, the actor Préville in the role of Sganarelle in “Le médecin malgré lui” by Molière, and Prince Dimitri Alexeievich Galitzine, Russian ambassador. Many other works are now lost.

From then on everyone recognised her talent, sincerity and lively spirit.

The Russian years 1766-1778 and Peter the Great's head 
In October 1766 Marie-Anne Collot accompanied her mentor, Etienne-Maurice Falconet, to St. Petersburg, when he was invited by Catherine the Great with a view to creating an equestrian statue of Peter the Great called “The Bronze Horseman”.

During this time she sculpted the portraits of members of the Russian Court. They marvelled at the talent of this young woman sculptor, they could remember none other, and she was only 18 years old.

Marie-Anne also created the plaster model that was selected for the Peter the Great's head for the statue, after Catherine had rejected three attempts by Falconet.

In December of the same year she presented her work to the Imperial Academy of Arts, of which she was elected a member on 20 January 1767.

She received a comfortable pension, which to her represented a fortune.

Marble busts

Collot sculpted a bust representing Falconet at Catherine the Great's request. This is now in the Museum of Fine Art in Nancy, France. She also requested a bust of Diderot in 1772. When Falconet saw its quality it is said that he destroyed the one he had made himself of Diderot. The bust is in the State Hermitage Museum in St. Petersburg.

Then followed busts of Henry IV of France, Sully, Voltaire, and possibly one of D'Alembert (now lost?). Also several of the Empress herself, the Grand Duke Paul I and his wife the Grand Duchess Natalia, as well as marble medallions of historical characters and people associated with the Russian court; Peter the Great, the Empress Elizabeth, and Lady Cathcart, the wife of Lord Cathcart, British Ambassador to Russia. She also made a superb bust of their daughter Mary. It was said that there started to be a shortage of marble in St. Petersburg.

Marriage and the return to France
In 1777 Marie-Anne Collot married the painter Pierre-Etienne Falconet in St. Petersburg. He was the son of Etienne Falconet. She moved to England with him where he studied with Joshua Reynolds. In England, she continued her passion with sculpting more busts, including one of Lady Cathcart. A daughter was born of the union a year later. The marriage was however unhappy and short-lived. Madame Falconet returned to France in 1778 with her baby.

The stay in Holland
In 1782 Collot went to Holland at the invitation of her friend, Princess Galitzine. While there, she sculpted the marble busts of William, Prince of Orange, and of his wife, Princess Wilhelmina of Prussia.

An early retirement
Collot gave up sculpting completely, concentrating from then on her daughter's education and helping her father-in-law who had fallen gravely ill. She continued to do so until his death in 1791.

The French Revolution completely upset the world of artists, writers and philosophers. With her master, her husband and her friends having died, in 1791 Madame Falconet bought a country estate at Marimont, near the village of Bourdonnay in Moselle, France. She retired to there and led a peaceful life. She died in Nancy, and is buried at Bourdonnay.

Works of art
In the State Hermitage Museum, St. Petersburg
Bust of Falconet
Bust of Diderot
Bust of Voltaire
Bust of Henry IV
Bust of Sully
(location to be specified)
Bust of Catherine the Great (probably in the Hermitage Museum)
Bust of Peter the Great and several busts of Catherine the Great
In the Russian Museum, St. Petersburg
Portrait of Peter the Great
Medallion of the Count Grigory Grigoryevich Orlov
In the Marble Palace, St. Petersburg
Bust of the Grand Duke Paul
Bust of the Grand Duchess Natalia
In the State Museum at Tsarskoye Selo, south of St. Petersburg
Bust of a young Russian girl
In the Louvre Museum, Paris
Portrait assumed to be of Peter the Great
Portrait assumed to be of Étienne Noël Damilaville
Portrait assumed to be of Mary Cathcart, the daughter of the British ambassador to Russia
In the Musée des Beaux-Arts, Nancy, France
Portrait of Etienne-Maurice Falconet
Portrait of his son Pierre-Etienne Falconet
In private collections
Portrait of Melchior Grimm
Portrait of Dimitri Alexeïevitch Galitzine
Marble medallion of Lady Cathcart

References

Sources, bibliography (in French)
Christiane Dellac, Marie-Anne Collot: Une sculptrice française à la cour de Catherine II, 1748-1821, L'Harmattan, (2005). This book includes a bibliography and a list of works of art, as well as a portrait of the artist on   the cover,
Charles Cournault, Marie-Anne Collot (1869)
Charles Cournault, Catalogue du Musée de la ville de Nancy
Louis Réau, Etienne-Maurice Falconet 1716-1791, Paris, Delmotte, 1922, t.II, chap. IV (L'Oeuvre de Marie-Anne Collot), p. 429-448
M.L. Becker, Marie-Anne Collot, L'art de la terre-cuite au féminin, L'Objet d'Art, n° 325, juin 1998. A convincing clarification of the portraits called “of Grimm and Damilaville”, and a portrait of Collot painted by her husband Pierre-Etienne,
M.L. Becker, Marie Collot à Pétersbourg, La culture française et les archives russes, Centre International d'études du XVIIIe siècle, Ferney-Voltaire, 2004. In the appendix a provisional catalogue of the works of art, mentioning those whose location is unknown, Numerous photos,
M.L. Becker, Le buste de Diderot, de Collot à Houdon, L'Objet d'Art, n° 412, avril 2006
 Digitaal Vrouwenlexicon van Nederland [2007]

External links

 Marie-Anne Collot, in Artcyclopedia
 

1748 births
1821 deaths
Portrait artists
French women sculptors
18th-century French sculptors
18th-century French women artists
19th-century French sculptors
19th-century French women artists
French sculptors